George Anson Starkweather may refer to:

George Anson Starkweather (New York politician) (1794–1879), United States Representative from New York
George Anson Starkweather (Pennsylvania lawyer) (1821–1904), American lawyer, merchant, schoolteacher and local official in Pennsylvania
George Anson Starkweather (Michigan businessman) (1826–1907), American merchant, schoolteacher, lawyer and member of the Michigan Legislature, nephew of the New York politician

See also
Starkweather (disambiguation)
George Anson (disambiguation)